Phạm Bá Ngoãn, pen name Thanh Hải (1930–1980) was a modern Vietnamese poet. His pen name "Thanh Hải" literally means "Blue Sea" in classical Sino-Vietnamese.

Biography
Ngoãn was born on 4 November 1930 in Phong Bình Commune, Phong Điền District, Thừa Thiên–Huế Province.  He was descended from a poor intelligentsia family. His father was a teacher, and his mother was a farmer.  Thanh Hải attended local schools through his childhood. When Thanh Hải was 17, he took part in revolutionary movements at Hương Thủy District, and became the commissar of a cultural and artistic troupe. During the 1954-1964 period, Thanh Hải took part in revolutionary movements in his native province, became a provincial propaganda and instruction cadre.

During the 1964-1967 period, he was in charge of the Cờ Giải phóng (Flag of Liberation) newspaper of Huế city.  Then he became a member of the Committee of Association of Vietnamese Writers, vice-president of Bình Trị Thiên Liberation Letters and Arts Branch.

After 1975, Thanh Hải became Secretary-general of Association of Bình-Trị-Thiên's Writers, member of the standing committee of Union of Vietnamese Arts and Literature.

Thanh Hải died because of cirrhosis on 15 December 1980 at Huế city.

Works
Những đồng chí trung kiên ("Faithful Comrades" 1962)
Huế mùa xuân (vol.1 - 1970, vol.2 - 1975)
Dấu võng Trường Sơn (1977)
Mưa xuân đất này (1982)
Thanh Hải thơ tuyển (1982)

Comments on Thanh Hải
The literature researcher Trần Hữu Tá wrote:

Translation:

The enduring and heroic struggle of the people of the South, of the people of Thừa Thiên, is the source of inspiration of Thanh Hải. After 1975, his poems became more matured.  The poem "Mùa xuân nho nhỏ" (1980, made on his sickbed shortly before his death) is his most notable success.
In general, his poems are heartfelt, unstudied, honest and sincere. However, he rarely innovated his style, sometimes he repeated his past self. Toward the anti-US poetry of South Vietnam, Thanh Hải is one of the writer who have many contributions...

Awards
Nguyễn Đình Chiểu Literature Prize (1965)
State Prize of Arts and Literature (đợt 2, year 2000, bestowed posthumously)
1st Prize of Poetry Competition of Thống nhất newsweekly (1959).
2nd Prize of Poetry Competition of Thống nhất newsweekly (1962).

Notes

References
Trần Hữu Tá, entry Thanh Hải, in Từ điển văn học (Literature dictionary - new edition). Thế giới Publisher, 2004.
Phong Lê, article about Thanh Hải in Nhà thơ Việt Nam hiện đại (Modern Vietnamese poets). Compiled by Institute of Literature of Vietnam, published by Social Science Publisher on 1984 at Hà Nội.

Vietnamese male poets
1930 births
1980 deaths
20th-century Vietnamese poets
20th-century male writers